Hart Creek is a stream in Perkins County in the U.S. state of South Dakota. It is a tributary to Thunder Butte Creek.

The headwaters arise at  an elevation of 2770 feet about six miles east of Bison and just north of South Dakota Highway 20 and southeast of the Boxcar Buttes area.

Hart Creek was named after an early settler.

See also
List of rivers of South Dakota

References

Rivers of Perkins County, South Dakota
Rivers of South Dakota